Balacobaco (Literally English: Mess, International title: Tricky Business or Los Tramposos for Spanish markets) is a Brazilian primetime telenovela created, developed and written by Giselle Joras and directed by Leonardo Miranda and Edson Spinello.

The series premiered on Thursday, October 4, 2012 at 10:15 p.m. (BRT/AMT) on Rede Record, replacing Máscaras, and ended on Monday, May 20, 2013, being replaced by Dona Xepa.

Juliana Silveira and Victor Pecoraro stars the protagonists, while Bruno Ferrari and Bárbara Borges star as the main antagonists.

Plot
Isabel Vilela (Juliana Silveira) is about to fulfill one of her greatest wishes. She's been married for a year with the cheerful Danilo (Roger Gobeth) when she realizes that she's pregnant on the eve of a romantic trip. Isabel's professional life is also booming, with financial help from Danilo, she's about to inaugurate her own architecture firm.

However, all of her dreams vanish when she discovers the truth about her husband: Danilo is a young man who has a gambling addiction and is drowning in debt. Reason for which they have to sell the apartment that they live in, dissolve the architecture firm and cancel the trip they have planned. When thieves threaten Danilo, Isabel sees a side of Danilo that she didn't know. This causes her to lose her baby and with it, puts an end to their relationship.

Eduardo (Victor Pecorato) is a senior partner at Radical Adventure, an ecological tourism agency who is finally breaking even from the initial investment. Part of the company's funding comes from an inheritance that his father left him.

Norberto (Bruno Ferrari), Eduardo's hypocritical partner at Radical Adventure resents the fact that he is a minor partner in the company. His desire is to sell the agency and invest in his personal projects, which are without merit. To top it off, he is madly in love with Eduardo's girlfriend, Fabiana (Alice Assef). Eduardo's successes provoke Norberto's envy, which is now focused on bringing his rival down. At the same time, Eduardo doesn't seem to notice Norberto's ruses against him.

Cast

Ratings

References

External links 
 

2012 Brazilian television series debuts
2013 Brazilian television series endings
2012 telenovelas
RecordTV telenovelas
Brazilian telenovelas
Portuguese-language telenovelas
Television shows set in Rio de Janeiro (city)